A fish and chip shop, sometimes referred to as a chip shop, is a restaurant that specialises in selling fish and chips. Usually, fish and chip shops provide takeaway service, although some have seating facilities. Fish and chip shops may also sell other foods, including variations on their core offering such as battered sausage and burgers, to regional cuisine such as Greek or Indian food.

Variations on the name include fish bar, fishery (in Yorkshire), fish shop and chip shop. In the United Kingdom including Northern Ireland, they are colloquially known as a chippy or  fishy, while in the rest of Ireland and the Aberdeen area, they are known as chippers.

History
A blue plaque at Oldham's Tommyfield Market in England marks the 1860s origin of the fish and chip shop and fast food industries. In 1928, Harry Ramsden's fast food restaurant chain opened in the UK. On a single day in 1952, his fish and chip shop in Guiseley, West Yorkshire, served 10,000 portions of fish and chips, earning itself a place in the Guinness Book Of Records.

Etymology
The word "chip shop" is first recorded by the Oxford English Dictionary in 1892. "Chippy" or "chippie" was first recorded in 1961.
Occasionally the type of fish will be specified, as in 'Cod-n-Chips'.

Operations
Many British villages, suburbs, towns and cities have fish and chip shops, especially near coastal regions.

Fish and chip outlets sell roughly 30% of all the white fish consumed in the United Kingdom, and they use 10% of the UK potato crop.

In Ireland, many "chippers" are operated by Italian immigrant families, all native to the Province of Frosinone in Lazio. The Italian chip shop tradition began with Giuseppe Cervi, who took a boat to America in the 1880s but instead disembarked at Queenstown (modern-day Cobh in County Cork) and walked to Dublin, establishing a takeaway at 22 Great Brunswick Street (modern-day Pearse Street).

Regional differences

In Scotland, the fish tends to be haddock, whereas in England it tends to be cod. This is because both fish tend to be sourced from Scottish waters in the North Sea and then shipped around the UK. Haddock was thought to taste better than cod when fresh, while cod tasted better a few days later. In the days before refrigerated haulage this meant that haddock would taste bad by the time it made it out of Scotland, while the cod would still taste good if it took a few days to reach its destination. Hake, pollock, whiting, and plaice are also seen at many chip shops. In Scotland, 'special fish' is a variant where the haddock is breadcrumbed instead of battered.

A number of fish and chip shop condiments exist, including salt and vinegar (very often actually non-brewed condiment) across the UK, mushy peas and curry sauce in various parts of the UK, chip spice in Hull, chippy sauce in Edinburgh, gravy across much of the UK, mushy pea and mint sauce in Nottingham, and gravy and cheese in Yorkshire. In Canada, most shops offer malt vinegar or the option to add gravy, usually for a small charge. 

There are also regional variations with the oil used to cook the fish and chips. Traditional frying uses beef dripping or lard, which are still used in the Midlands and the North; however, vegetable oils, such as palm oil, rapeseed or peanut oil (used because of its relatively high smoke point) now predominate, particularly in the South.

There are also a number of other offerings at fish and chip shops that do not involve fish, such as the battered sausage. It is now generally rare to find a fish and chip shop that offers no main course besides fish and chips in the UK. Burgers, pies, pasties, pizzas, sausages, kebabs and chicken (all of which may or may not be served or bought with chips) are all regular menu items in many outlets. Many also offer chips with topping options such as cheese, mushy peas, gravy or curry sauce.  

In Australia, a common variant of the fish and chip shop is one that sells charcoal chicken in addition to the usual battered fish and related foods.

There are also regional variations across the UK, including: 
 Pastie in Northern Ireland
 Potato scallops in the West Midlands (a deep-fried slice of potato) 
 Deep fried Mars bars in Scotland
 Red pudding in Fife, Scotland
 Pukka Pies in England
 Saveloy in London
 Faggots in Coventry and the Black Country
 Batter bits in Leeds and the North
 Battered roe in the West Midlands
 Orange Chips or Battered Chips in the Black Country
 Pizza Crunch in Glasgow
 Pickled onion in the West Midlands and other parts of the UK
 Battered white pudding in Scotland and Northern Ireland
 Deep fried haggis as a supper across Scotland. As "Haggis Balls" in Glasgow or "Haggis Bon-Bons" in Edinburgh.
 Pea fritters
 Yorkshire Fishcake
 Rag pudding in Oldham
 Butter pie in Lancashire
 Doner kebab in the Midlands and other parts of the UK
 Scampi in various parts of the UK
 Chip butty in various parts of the UK
 Steak and kidney pie in various parts of the UK
 Babies 'Yed in the North West of England
 Light-fried half chicken in the Midlands and other parts of the UK
 Spam fritters in various parts of the UK
 Rock in Cornwall and the south
 Lemon sole in Cornwall and the south
 Rissoles in South Wales
 Wigan Kebab (meat and potato pie in a buttered barm) in Wigan
 Pasty barm in Bolton

There are also variations in the fish and chip shops in nations and former nations of the British Commonwealth:
 "Burger With The Lot" or "Works Burger" in Australia and New Zealand
 Poutine in Canada
 Dim sims in Australia and New Zealand
 Chiko Rolls in Australia
 Spice Burger in Ireland
 Hot sandwiches (usually chicken or turkey with peas and gravy) in Canada

See also
 List of fish and chip restaurants

References

External links

Restaurants in the United Kingdom
 
Restaurants by type